Storå is a locality situated in Lindesberg Municipality, Örebro County, Sweden with 1,933 inhabitants in 2010.

Storå is mostly known for having an old iron mine which has been in use until since the 1500 century before being closed down in the 1950s and turned into a convention center hosting a Christmas fair every year. It is also a popular museum for the local schools Hagabacken and Storåskolan. The mine also hosts a popular chocolate café. In Storå there is also an ice rink with a football field hosting an all girls football team while the ice rink hosts the local ice hockey team Guldsmedshyttan SK (GSK).

Riksdag elections

References

External links 
 Om Storå

Populated places in Örebro County
Populated places in Lindesberg Municipality